Gaston and His Sister is a 1923 Expressionist oil on canvas painting by the Flemish artist Gustave Van de Woestijne, now in the Royal Museum of Fine Arts, Antwerp.

He produced it during a year's stay in London. It was one of the most important works in the artist's first solo exhibition, which occurred at the 'Le Centaure' gallery in 1925. During the First World War he had become friends with Valerius De Saedeleer and Georges Minne and regularly visited art galleries and museums, whilst after the war he had traveled to Paris to see art exhibitions.

References 

1923 paintings
Expressionist paintings
20th-century portraits
Paintings in the collection of the Royal Museum of Fine Arts Antwerp
Paintings by Gustave Van de Woestijne
Paintings of children